Henry Fleetwood may refer to:
 Henry Fleetwood (Aylesbury MP)  (born c 1565), MP for Aylesbury 1589, Wycombe 1601–11
 Henry Fleetwood (Preston MP) (c1667–1746), MP for Preston 1708–22

See also 
 Fleetwood (surname)